Hahncappsia marialis is a moth in the family Crambidae. It was described by Hahn William Capps in 1967 and it is found in Guatemala.

The wingspan is about 24 mm for males and 24–26 mm for females. Adults have been recorded on wing in June.

References

Moths described in 1967
Pyraustinae